The Dermatology Online Journal is a monthly open-access peer-reviewed medical journal that was established in 1995 by Arthur Huntley (Department of Dermatology, University of California, Davis). It is published by the California Digital Library and covers all aspects of general dermatology. The current editor-in-chief is Barbara Burrall (University of California Davis).

Besides medical information, the journal provides medical perspectives on non-medical topics and the Dermatology Online Journal published the first dermatology training program ranking.

Abstracting and Indexing 
The journal is indexed in PubMed, MEDLINE, and Scopus.

References

External links
 

Dermatology journals
English-language journals
Monthly journals
Publications established in 1995
University of California, Davis
Open access journals